Elections to Rochford Council were held on 6 May 2010. One third of the council was up for election and the Conservative party stayed in overall control of the council.

The Conservative Party won 13 seats up for election with surprise result with the Green Party gaining their first seat from the Conservative Party and Rochford District Residents holding one seat.

Results

Ward Results

Downhall and Rawreth

Foulness & Great Wakering

Grange

Hawkwell North

Hawkwell South

Hawkwell West

Hockley Central

Hullbridge

Rayleigh Central

Rochford

Trinity

Wheatley

Whitehouse

References

2010
2010 English local elections
May 2010 events in the United Kingdom
2010s in Essex